Mihter Wendolin (born February 3, 1987 in Pohnpei) is a Micronesian sprinter.  She competed in the 100 metres competition at the 2012 Summer Olympics; she ran the preliminaries in 13.67 seconds, which did not qualify her for Round 1.

Achievements

References

External links
 
 

1987 births
Living people
People from Pohnpei State
Federated States of Micronesia female sprinters
Olympic track and field athletes of the Federated States of Micronesia
Athletes (track and field) at the 2012 Summer Olympics
Olympic female sprinters